Marvin Katz (November 22, 1930 – October 12, 2010) was a United States district judge of the United States District Court for the Eastern District of Pennsylvania.

Education and career

Born in Philadelphia, Pennsylvania, Katz received a Bachelor of Arts degree from the University of Pennsylvania in 1951 and a Bachelor of Laws from Yale Law School in 1954. He was in private practice in Philadelphia from 1954 to 1977, serving as a law clerk for Judge Francis X. McClanaghan of Pennsylvania's Court of Common Pleas from 1959 to 1960. Katz was an assistant to the Commissioner of the United States Internal Revenue Service from 1977 to 1981, thereafter returning to private practice in Philadelphia until 1983.

Federal judicial service

On June 21, 1983, President Ronald Reagan nominated Katz to a seat on the United States District Court for the Eastern District of Pennsylvania vacated by Judge Joseph Simon Lord III. Katz was confirmed by the United States Senate on August 4, 1983, and received his commission on August 6, 1983. Katz assumed senior status on August 26, 1997, serving in that capacity until his death on October 12, 2010, in Philadelphia.

References

Sources
 

1930 births
2010 deaths
Judges of the United States District Court for the Eastern District of Pennsylvania
United States district court judges appointed by Ronald Reagan
20th-century American judges
University of Pennsylvania alumni
Yale Law School alumni
Lawyers from Philadelphia